Ivan Garvanov (December 23, 1869 in Stara Zagora, today Bulgaria – November 28, 1907 in Sofia) was a Bulgarian revolutionary and leader of the revolutionary movement in Ottoman Macedonia and Southern Thrace.

Biography 
He was born in Stara Zagora, then in the Ottoman Empire. His father was a  merchant who had been killed during the Russo-Turkish War in 1878, and his uncle and grandfather had also been killed by the Turks. Garvanov had been in Plovdiv at the time of the Unification of the Principality of Bulgaria and Eastern Rumelia and supported it. He learned mathematics in Sofia, and Vienna, where the Austrian Academy of Sciences published a work of his. From 1894 onwards, Garvanov worked as a Bulgarian teacher in Thessaloniki. In 1897 he founded the Bulgarian Secret Revolutionary Brotherhood and later entered the Internal Macedonian Adrianople Revolutionary Organization (IMARO).

In fact, initially the real aim of Garvanov was to take over the IMRO, and thus prevent the early outbreak of an uprising which he believed would bring disaster upon the population. However, later he changed his opinion and the reason was the death of his colleague Christo Ganev. Ganev was a chemistry teacher and was killed in June 1897 in Thessaloniki by a renegade Bulgarian, who became a Serboman. Garvanov himself was wounded while trying to save his colleague. He was introduced into the organization in 1899 by Dame Gruev. In 1900 Garvanov was chosen as a leader of the Regional Committee in Salonica and in 1901 he became a member of Central Committee and later a leader of the IMARO.

In this way, under the leadership of Garvanov, the IMARO made a decision supporting a military revolt. As president of  the Central Committee, he convened in January 1903 a congress in Thessaloniki, that resolved to launch an uprising against the Ottomans. The question regarding the timing of the uprising implicated an apparent discordance among the IMARO's leadership. This led to debates among the representatives at the Sofia IMARO's Conference in March 1903. The Centralists' majority was convinced that if the Organization would unleash an uprising, Bulgaria would declare war of the Ottomans and after the subsequent intervention of the Great Powers the Empire would collapse. The left-wing faction warned against the risks of such unrealistic plans, opposing the uprising as inappropriate as tactics and premature by time. In April Garvanov met with Dame Gruev and Gotse Delchev and they discussed the decision of starting the uprising. Garvanov, himself, did not participate in the Ilinden uprising, because of his arrest and exile in Rhodes after the Thessaloniki bombings of 1903.

In 1904 he was amnestied by the authorities and settled in Sofia where he worked as a teacher. The failure of the uprising reignited the rivalries between the varying factions of the Macedonian revolutionary movement. The left-wing faction opposed Bulgarian nationalism but the Centralist's faction of the IMARO, drifted more and more towards it. The years 1905–1907 saw the slow split between the two factions. Finally, the leaders of the Centralist's were sentenced to death from the leftists. Garvanov, along with Boris Sarafov was killed by Todor Panitsa, close to the left wing leader of IMARO Yane Sandanski, in 1907. Garvanov was one of the staunchest opponents of Sandanski in the squabbles dividing the IMARO after 1903. The assassination of Sarafov and Garvanov, turned the IMARO factions into a war of extermination that lasted for decades.

References and notes 

1869 births
1907 deaths
Politicians from Stara Zagora
Bulgarian revolutionaries
Members of the Internal Macedonian Revolutionary Organization
Bulgarian educators
Macedonia under the Ottoman Empire
Exiles from the Ottoman Empire
Thracian Bulgarians
Assassinated Bulgarian people
People murdered in Bulgaria
Burials at Central Sofia Cemetery
Deaths by firearm in Bulgaria